Wanda Elaine Stopa (May 5, 1900 – April 25, 1924) was a Polish-American lawyer and murderer who committed suicide the day after committing her crime.

Life 

Stopa was born in Warsaw, Poland in 1900 but emigrated to the United States with her parents and siblings, ending up in Chicago's Little Poland neighborhood. Her father was a clay sculpture modeler in Chicago and her mother came from a prominent Polish family. While living in her parents rigidly conformist home, she studied at The John Marshall Law School, passed the bar exam and became Chicago's youngest and first woman assistant U.S. district attorney. Others described her as extremely smart and of a dominating emotional nature.

In search of a more individualistic and independent lifestyle, Stopa moved to a studio with other of creatives located in the Bohemian Towertown neighborhood. True to the reputation of the roaring twenties, the studio was the site of late night parties and non-traditional lifestyles. Stopa lived at the studio for three years and for one summer, an advertising executive named Y. Kenley Smith and his wife, a pianist, lived there as well. 

Also living at the artist's studio was a Russian man whom she married, variously referred to in the press as "Vlad" or "Ted", "Glaskoff", "Glasko", "Glasgow" or "Glaskow". There is also confusion about this Russian man's background. He described himself as a count who lost a fortune in the Russian Revolution but Stopa's brothers portrayed him as a bootlegger and professional gambler. Stopa and this man separated soon after marrying. 

Smith financially supported Stopa as an intellectual and artist. At some point, Stopa and Smith began an affair but when Smith broke off the relationship, Stopa was extremely unhappy and demanded he leave his wife for her. Stopa traveled to the Smiths' Palos Park cottage in the outskirts of the city and tried to shoot her lover's wife, named Doodles, but accidentally shot and killed their 68-year old gardener, Henry Manning. The husband, Kenley Smith, was at work in downtown Chicago at the time of the shooting and was quickly picked up by the authorities for his protection and for an interview. She fled the scene and led the police on a manhunt.

Death 

Stopa committed suicide by ingesting cyanide in a room in the Detroit Statler Hotel. Stopa's brothers speculated that her estranged Russian husband provided the poison and described his influence on her life as "evil". Crushed by the loss of their friend, the artists from the bohemian studio asked to be involved with Stopa's funeral. Enticed by the juicy nature of a tragic love story, her funeral drew large amount of curious onlookers and gawkers, some figures say 10,000 people. She is buried at the Bohemian National Cemetery.

Popular culture 
Ernest Hemingway was a one time tenant and friend of Stopa's lover, Kenley Smith. After reading of the scandal in the newspaper, Hemingway privately reacted to it with dark amusement. In 2019, Stopa's story was featured in a Season 13 episode of the American television series Deadly Women, with Kelsie Feltrin portraying Stopa. The story of Wanda Stopa was also the subject of episode 108 of the Chicago History Podcast. The award winning blog 1,001 Chicago Afternoons by Paul Dailing delved into story of Wanda Stopa in post number 283, named The Murderess Down the Block.

References 

1900 births
1924 suicides
1924 murders in the United States
Lawyers from Chicago
American murderers
American female murderers
John Marshall Law School (Chicago) alumni
Suicides in Michigan
Burials at Bohemian National Cemetery (Chicago)
History of Chicago
20th-century American lawyers
Suicides by cyanide poisoning
20th-century American women lawyers
Emigrants from the Russian Empire to the United States
Polish murderers
Congress Poland emigrants to the United States
19th-century American lawyers
1924 deaths
19th-century American women